View from the Ground is the tenth studio album by American folk rock duo America, released by Capitol Records in July 1982.

This album marked a comeback for a group that had been generally written off since Dan Peek's departure five years before. It was a modest hit in the US, reaching number 41 on the Billboard album chart, and produced two hit singles: "You Can Do Magic" reached number eight on the Billboard singles chart and number five on the adult contemporary chart, and "Right Before Your Eyes" (also popularly known as "Rudolph Valentino") peaked at 45 on the Billboard singles chart and 16 on the adult contemporary chart. "You Can Do Magic" spent more time on the charts, 20 weeks, than any other America single. 

The song "Inspector Mills" was a hit in the Philippines in the '80s and remains to be one of the known America songs in this country to date.

Reception

Allmusic gave high praise to the hit songs "You Can Do Magic" and "Right Before Your Eyes", but deemed View from the Ground "an exceptionally slick-sounding yet pedestrian album overall". They recommended that listeners instead seek out the two hits, especially "You Can Do Magic", on greatest hits compilations.

Track listing

Personnel 

America
 Gerry Beckley – vocals, keyboards (2–5, 9, 10), guitars (2–5, 9, 10)
 Dewey Bunnell – vocals, guitars (2–5, 9, 10)

with:
 Russ Ballard – all instruments on "You Can Do Magic" and "Jody", backing vocals (1, 8)
 Chris Coté – keyboards (6, 7), backing vocals
 Jai Winding – keyboards (6, 7)
 Mark Isham – synthesizers (6, 7)
 Hadley Hockensmith – guitars (2–5, 9, 10)
 Steve Lukather – guitars (2–5, 9, 10)
 Bill Mumy – guitars (2–5, 9, 10)
 Dean Parks – guitars (2–5, 9, 10)
 Michael Woods – guitars (2–5, 9, 10)
 Mike Mirage – guitars (6, 7), backing vocals
 Rick Neigher – guitars (6, 7), backing vocals 
 Brad Palmer – bass (2–5, 9, 10)
 Mike Porcaro – bass (6, 7)
 Jeff Porcaro – drums (6, 7)
 Willie Leacox – drums (1–5, 8-10)
 Alvin Taylor – drums (6, 7)
 Matthew McCauley – string arrangements and conductor
 Christopher Cross – backing vocals
 Michael McDonald – backing vocals
Tom Kelly – backing vocals
 Chuck Kirkpatrick – backing vocals
 Timothy B. Schmit – backing vocals
 Sara Taylor – backing vocals
 Carl Wilson – backing vocals

Production 
 Russ Ballard – producer (1, 8)
 America – producers (2–5, 9, 10)
 Bobby Colomby – producer (6, 7)
 Chuck Kirkpatrick – engineer (1, 8)
 Mark Linett – recording (2–5, 9, 10), mixing (2–5, 9, 10)
 David Cole – engineer (6, 7)
 Jeremy Smith – engineer (6, 7)
 Michael Verdick – mixing (6, 7)
 Wally Traugott – mastering 
 Andrea Farber – production coordinator 
 Susan Gilman – production coordinator 
 Phyllis Chotin – art direction 
 Michele Hart – art direction
 Bob Carroll – graphics
 Guy Webster – photography 
 Katz-Gallin-Morey – management
 Mixed at Location Recording Service (Burbank, California) and Amigo Studios.
 Mastered at Capitol Mastering (Hollywood, California).

Charts

References

America (band) albums
Capitol Records albums
1982 albums
Albums produced by Russ Ballard
Albums produced by Bobby Colomby
Albums recorded at Capitol Studios